Eye Alaska was an American rock band from Orange County, California, formed in 2006.  Two members, Brandon Wronski and Cameron Trowbridge, were former members of Dead Letter Diaries.

Eye Alaska signed to Fearless Records in February 2008, and released their debut EP titled Yellow & Elephant shortly after. They released their debut full-length album, Genesis Underground, on July 7, 2009. Genesis Underground reached No. 38 on the Billboard Top Heatseekers chart.

The band announced via Facebook on September 23, 2011 that they are to cease their existence as Eye Alaska and move on, as individuals, into other areas, not exclusively in music.

Personnel
 Roy English - lead vocals, guitar, piano, programming
 Cameron Trowbridge - guitar, backing vocals
 Christopher Osegueda - bass guitar, backing vocals
 Chase Kensrue - guitar, piano, backing vocals
 Han Ko - drums

Discography

Studio albums

Extended plays 
2008: Yellow & Elephant

References

External links
Eye Alaska at Myspace
Full Review of 'Genesis Underground' From Thealbumproject.net

Alternative rock groups from California
Musical groups established in 2006
Fearless Records artists
Musical groups from Orange County, California